Neil Patrick Harris (born June 15, 1973) is an American actor, singer, writer, producer, and television host. Primarily known for his comedic television roles and dramatic and musical stage roles, he has received multiple accolades throughout his career, including a Tony Award, five Primetime Emmy Awards, and nominations for a Grammy Award and three Screen Actors Guild Awards.

On television, he is known for playing the title character on the ABC series Doogie Howser, M.D. (1989–1993), for which he was nominated for the Golden Globe Award for Best Actor – Television Series Musical or Comedy, as well as Barney Stinson on the CBS series How I Met Your Mother (2005–2014, for which he was nominated for four Emmy Awards), and Count Olaf on the Netflix series A Series of Unfortunate Events (2017–2019). Harris is also known for his role as the title character in Joss Whedon's musical Dr. Horrible's Sing-Along Blog (2008) and a fictional version of himself in the Harold & Kumar film series (2004–2011). His other films include Starship Troopers (1997), Beastly (2011), The Smurfs (2011), The Smurfs 2 (2013), A Million Ways to Die in the West (2014), and Gone Girl (2014).

In 2010, Harris won two awards at the 62nd Primetime Emmy Awards, winning for Outstanding Guest Actor in a Comedy Series for his guest appearance on Glee, and Outstanding Special Class Program for hosting the Tony Awards in 2009; he has won the latter award three additional times for hosting the show in 2011, 2012, and 2013. He also hosted the Primetime Emmy Awards in 2009 and 2013, and hosted the 87th Academy Awards in 2015, thus making him the first openly gay man to host the Academy Awards. In 2014, he starred in the title role in Hedwig and the Angry Inch on Broadway, for which he won the 2014 Tony Award for Best Leading Actor in a Musical. Harris was named one of Time magazine's 100 Most Influential People in 2010.

Early life and education
Harris was born in Albuquerque, New Mexico, and grew up in Ruidoso, New Mexico, with his older brother and their parents, Sheila Gail (née Scott; born 1946) and Ronald Gene Harris (born 1946). His parents were lawyers and also ran a restaurant. He attended La Cueva High School in Albuquerque, graduating with high honors in 1991, which he attributes to being privately tutored half the school year while on set.

Career

Film

Harris began his career as a child actor and was discovered by playwright Mark Medoff at a drama camp in Las Cruces, New Mexico. Medoff later cast him in the 1988 drama film Clara's Heart, starring Whoopi Goldberg and based on the novel of the same name by Joseph Olshan. Clara's Heart earned Harris a Golden Globe nomination. The same year, he starred in Purple People Eater, a children's fantasy.

Harris's first film role as an adult was 1995's Animal Room, although he portrayed a teenager. His subsequent film work has included supporting roles in The Next Best Thing, Undercover Brother, and Starship Troopers. In 2004, Harris played a fictionalized, hyper-womanising, lewd version of himself in the Harold and Kumar stoner comedy films Harold & Kumar Go to White Castle.  It was the shift from roles associated with his sanitized "Doogie Howser" character to the more unscrupulous and bawdy part in the Harold & Kumar franchise that liberated Harris and revitalized his acting career, leading to his now-iconic role of Barney Stinson in How I Met Your Mother the following year.  He would go on to reprise this role in the sequels: Harold & Kumar Escape from Guantanamo Bay and A Very Harold & Kumar 3D Christmas.

In 2010, Harris provided voice acting for the role of the adult Dick Grayson (Nightwing) in the animated film Batman: Under the Red Hood and the beagle Lou in the film Cats & Dogs: The Revenge of Kitty Galore. The same year, he played the lead in the indie comedy The Best and the Brightest. On March 7, 2010, he made a surprise appearance at the 82nd Academy Awards, delivering the opening musical number. He starred in the films The Smurfs (2011) and The Smurfs 2 (2013). Harris provided the voice of Steve the Monkey in the Cloudy with a Chance of Meatballs film franchise.

In 2014, Harris showed a more serious side in Gone Girl, directed by David Fincher. Harris co-starred in the film as Desi Collings, the wealthy and obsessed ex-boyfriend of Amy Dunne, played by Rosamund Pike. Harris has said: "I was pinching myself at the opportunity" to work with Fincher. He received general praise from critics for his performance, as did the film.

On February 22, 2015, Harris hosted the 87th Academy Awards; it was his first time hosting the ceremony, and the first time an openly gay man hosted the Academy Awards.

In October 2019, it was announced Harris would star in the fourth installment of the Matrix franchise.

Stage

Harris has worked on Broadway in both musical and dramatic roles. He played Tobias Ragg in the 2001 concert performances of Sweeney Todd. In 2002, he performed beside Anne Heche in Proof. In 2003, he took the role of the Emcee in Cabaret alongside Deborah Gibson and Tom Bosley. As a result of his critically acclaimed performance in Cabaret, Harris was named the top-drawing headliner in the role of the Emcee by GuestStarCasting.com, outranking fellow celebrity stars John Stamos and Alan Cumming. In 2004, he performed the dual role of the Balladeer and Lee Harvey Oswald on Broadway in the revival of Stephen Sondheim's musical Assassins. He also sang the role of Charles (initially played by Anthony Perkins in a 1966 ABC telecast) on the Nonesuch recording of Sondheim's Evening Primrose and portrayed Mark Cohen in the 1997 touring company of the musical Rent, a role he satirized on the January 10, 2009 episode of Saturday Night Live, which he hosted.

In 2010, Harris directed a production of the rock musical Rent at the Hollywood Bowl; he cast his Beastly co-star Vanessa Hudgens as Mimi. In 2011, Harris played the lead role of Bobby in Stephen Sondheim's Company with the New York Philharmonic in concert, opposite Patti LuPone and others. That same year, he directed The Expert at the Card Table at Broad Stage's Edye in Santa Monica, California.

Harris has hosted the Tony Awards four times: the 63rd Tony Awards on June 7, 2009, the 65th Tony Awards on June 12, 2011, the 66th Tony Awards on June 10, 2012, and the 67th Tony Awards on June 9, 2013. Only Dame Angela Lansbury, with five ceremonies, has hosted the Tony Awards more times. Hosting the Tony Awards has earned him four Primetime Emmy Awards in 2010, 2012, 2013 and 2014 for the 63rd, 65th, 66th and 67th, respectively.

A week after hosting the Tonys, it was announced that Harris would portray the titular role in the first Broadway production of the rock musical Hedwig and the Angry Inch, which he did from March through August 2014. Harris went on to win the 2014 Tony Award for Best Actor in a Musical.

In 2022, he joined the New York City Center Encores! presentation of Stephen Sondheim's Into the Woods as The Baker opposite Sara Bareilles as The Baker's Wife. The cast also included Heather Hedley, Gavin Creel, and Denée Benton. The limited production ran from May 4 to May 15.

Television
Beginning in 1989, Harris played the title role of a child prodigy doctor in Doogie Howser, M.D., for which he was nominated for a Golden Globe. After the show's four-season run ended in 1993, Harris played a number of guest roles on television series, including Murder, She Wrote. From 1999 to 2000, he starred with Tony Shalhoub in the NBC sitcom Stark Raving Mad, which lasted 22 episodes. He has played lead roles in a number of made-for-television features including Snowbound: The Jim and Jennifer Stolpa Story in 1994, My Ántonia in 1995, The Christmas Wish in 1998, Joan of Arc in 1999, The Wedding Dress in 2001, and The Christmas Blessing in 2005.

From 2005 to 2014, Harris played Barney Stinson, a serial womanizer, in the CBS ensemble sitcom How I Met Your Mother. The role earned him Emmy nominations every year from 2007 to 2010. In 2008, Harris guest-starred on Sesame Street as the Sesame Street Fairy Shoe Person. In 2009, he hosted the 7th Annual TV Land Awards and appeared as a guest judge on Season 9 of American Idol. Harris hosted the 61st Primetime Emmy Awards on September 20, 2009. On August 21, 2010, he won two Emmy Awards at the Creative Arts Emmy Awards ceremony, one of which was for his guest performance in the television series Glee. Harris hosted the 65th Primetime Emmy Awards on September 22, 2013, marking his second time hosting the event.

After a preview at the San Diego Comic-Con, a musical episode of Batman: The Brave and the Bold featuring Harris as the villainous Music Meister premiered on October 23, 2009, on Cartoon Network. As a character who could make anyone do his bidding by singing, he spent most of the episode singing several original songs. In 2010, Harris filmed a pilot episode for an American adaptation of the British game show The Cube as host, though it was not picked up to series.

In 2014, Harris turned down the chance to replace David Letterman as host of the Late Show on CBS, stating that he feared he would get bored of the repetition that hosting a nightly talk show would entail. He also rejected the suggestion of replacing Craig Ferguson as host of The Late Late Show on the same grounds, although he claims he was never actually offered either job.

On September 15, 2015, Best Time Ever with Neil Patrick Harris, a live variety series hosted by Harris on NBC, made its debut but was cancelled after an eight-episode run.

On January 15, 2016, Netflix cast Harris in the television adaptation of A Series of Unfortunate Events, in which he stars as Count Olaf. It ran for 3 seasons and 25 episodes before ending on January 1, 2019.

On March 31, 2017, NBC picked up Harris's game show titled Genius Junior, the format would test the smarts of the most brilliant children in the country. Harris would serve as host and executive producer. The series received a 10-episode order and debuted on March 18, 2018.

In January 2021, Harris starred in the British drama series, It's a Sin, broadcast on Channel 4, depicting the 1980s HIV/AIDS epidemic in the United Kingdom. In June 2021, Harris was announced to be a judge on Australia's Got Talent: Challengers & Champions, a spin-off series of Australia's Got Talent.

In June 2022, it was announced that Harris would play a villain for the 60th anniversary of Doctor Who. In July 2022, Harris starred in the Netflix series Uncoupled as gay Manhattanite Michael Lawson, a realtor re-navigating the dating scene after 17 years.

Other media
In 2007, Harris worked with Mike Nelson on an audio commentary for RiffTrax. The two "riffed" on the film Willy Wonka & the Chocolate Factory. Harris is a big fan of the cult TV series Nelson worked on, Mystery Science Theater 3000. Harris was interviewed for a 1992 Comedy Central special This Is MST3K hosted by Penn Jillette about the series and its fans. In 2008, Harris played the title role in Joss Whedon's musical web series Dr. Horrible's Sing-Along Blog alongside Nathan Fillion and Felicia Day. The first episode of the series debuted on July 15, 2008. He has also provided his voice for the Disney California Adventure Park attraction California Screamin'.

On December 11, 2010, Harris hosted the Spike Video Game Awards.

In October 2014, Harris released a memoir titled Neil Patrick Harris: Choose Your Own Autobiography, which is structured like a Choose Your Own Adventure book. His autobiography spent two weeks on The New York Times Best Seller List. His debut young adult novel, The Magic Misfits, was released in November 2017 and is the first in a four-book series of the same name.

In October 2020, Harris released a single-player board game named Box One, produced by luxury playing card company Theory11. It is currently available exclusively through Target.

Harris has been a frequent guest narrator at Disney's Candlelight Processional at Walt Disney World.

Personal life

From 1997 to 1998, Harris dated actress Christine Taylor. In a 2008 appearance on The Howard Stern Show, he discussed how the relationship made him realize his true sexuality: "She's the coolest, nicest chick ever. She's an absolute catch, and I thought, 'If I'm not going to feel the super sparks with her... it probably means I'm gay.'"

Harris publicly came out as gay in November 2006, saying, "I am happy to dispel any rumors or misconceptions and am quite proud to say that I am a very content gay man living my life to the fullest and feel most fortunate to be working with wonderful people in the business I love."

Harris attended the Emmy Awards in September 2007 with his fiancé David Burtka, later confirming the relationship. In an interview on The Ellen DeGeneres Show, Harris said his relationship with Burtka began in 2004. On August 14, 2010, Harris announced that he and Burtka were expecting twins via a surrogate mother. Their son and daughter were born on October 12, 2010.

Following the passage of the Marriage Equality Act in New York on June 24, 2011, Harris and Burtka announced their engagement via Twitter, stating that they had proposed to each other five years earlier but kept the engagement secret until same-sex marriage became legal. On September 8, 2014, Harris announced on his Twitter page that Burtka and he were married over the weekend in Italy. Pamela Fryman, the long-time director of How I Met Your Mother, officiated the wedding while Elton John performed at the reception.  In 2013, the couple bought a townhouse in Harlem which they sold in 2022 for $6.9M.

Harris is a fan of magic, like his character on How I Met Your Mother. His character in American Horror Story: Freak Show was also a magician. Harris's Glee character performed magic as well. Harris won the Tannen's Magic Louis Award in 2006 and hosted the 2008 World Magic Awards on October 11, 2008. He previously served as the President of the Board of Directors of Hollywood's Magic Castle, from 2011 to 2014. Additionally, Harris and partner David Burtka were guests of honor for a Top Chef Masters episode that took place at the Magic Castle.

Philanthropy
Alongside his acting career, Harris has supported and contributed to various charities, organization, and foundations. These include:

 AIDS Healthcare Foundation
 Alex's Lemonade Stand Foundation
 American Cancer Society organization 
 Broadway Cares/Equity Fights AIDS organization
 Children International organization
 Clothes Off Our Back Foundation
 Elton John AIDS Foundation
 Entertainment Industry Foundation
 Feeding America organization
 First Book organization
 Food on Foot charity
 Global Green organization

 Hope North organization
 International Myeloma Foundation
 LeBron James Family Foundation
 Live Out Loud organization
 Los Angeles Mission organization
 Motion Picture and Television Fund Foundation
 Noreen Fraser Foundation
 Project Angel Food organization
 Real Medicine Foundation
 Stand Up To Cancer organization
 Susan G. Komen for the Cure organization
 The Trevor Project organization.

In October 2014, Harris attended a dinner for the Elton John AIDS Foundation and in September 2016, he and his husband were the honorary hosts of a culinary cookout to help raise money for the Alex's Lemonade Stand Foundation. In April 2019, Harris hosted WE Day California, a charity event that celebrates students who have made a change in their community.

Discography

Cast recordings

Singles

Acting credits

Film

Television

Theater

Web

Video games

Bibliography

Audiobooks 
 2014: Neil Patrick Harris: Choose Your Own Autobiography (read by the author), Random House Audio,

Awards and nominations

See also
 LGBT culture in New York City
 List of LGBT people from New York City

References

External links

 
 
 Neil Patrick Harris at Internet Off-Broadway Database
 
 
 
 2011 interview with The Sondheim Review

1973 births
Living people
20th-century American comedians
20th-century American male actors
20th-century American male singers
20th-century American singers
20th-century American LGBT people
21st-century American comedians
21st-century American male actors
21st-century American male singers
21st-century American singers
21st-century American male writers
21st-century American non-fiction writers
21st-century American screenwriters
21st-century American LGBT people
American agnostics
American autobiographers
American comedy musicians
American gay actors
American gay musicians
American gay writers
American magicians
American male child actors
American male comedians
American male film actors
American male musical theatre actors
American male non-fiction writers
American male screenwriters
American male stage actors
American male television actors
American male television writers
American male video game actors
American male voice actors
American male web series actors
American philanthropists
American television directors
American television hosts
American television writers
American theatre directors
American tenors
Comedians from New Mexico
Comedians from New York City
Drama Desk Award winners
Gay comedians
Gay memoirists
Gay screenwriters
Gay singers
La Cueva High School alumni
LGBT magicians
LGBT people from New Mexico
LGBT people from New York (state)
LGBT television producers
LGBT theatre directors
American LGBT singers
American LGBT screenwriters
Male actors from Albuquerque, New Mexico
Male actors from New Mexico
Male actors from New York City
People from Albuquerque, New Mexico
People from Ruidoso, New Mexico
Primetime Emmy Award winners
Screenwriters from New Mexico
Screenwriters from New York (state)
Shorty Award winners
Singers from New Mexico
Singers from New York City
Streamy Award winners
Television producers from New York City
Tony Award winners
Writers from Albuquerque, New Mexico
American LGBT comedians